Somedia is a Swiss publishing company, headquartered in Chur, Graubünden. The Somedia is a Media Empire in the east Switzerland. The most famous product from Somedia is the newspaper Südostschweiz.

Operations
It publishes the following newspapers:

 Bote der Urschweiz Schwyz
 Bündner Tagblatt Chur
 Bündner Woche Chur
 Die Südostschweiz Chur, Glarus and Uznach
 Höfner Volksblatt Wollerau
 La Quotidiana (in Romansh language) Chur
 Liechtensteiner Vaterland Vaduz
 Liechtensteiner Volksblatt Schaan
 March-Anzeiger Lachen
 Obersee-Nachrichten Rapperswil
 Werdenberger & Obertoggenburger Buchs

The company employs approximately 1,000 people.

See also
 List of companies of Switzerland
 List of newspapers in Switzerland

External links 
 suedostschweiz.ch (in German), the official website of Die Südostschweiz, one of the company's newspapers

Year of establishment missing
German-language mass media in Switzerland
Newspaper companies
Publishing companies of Switzerland
Grisons
Mass media in Chur